The men's team foil competition at the 2015 European Games in Baku was held on 27 June at the Crystal Hall 3.

Results

Final standing

References

External links

Men's team foil